William Jennings Bryan House or variations may refer to:

William Jennings Bryan House (Miami, Florida), listed on the National Register of Historic Places (NRHP), known also as Villa Serena
William Jennings Bryan Boyhood Home, Salem, Illinois, NRHP-listed
William Jennings Bryan House (Lincoln, Nebraska), NRHP-listed and a U.S. National Historic Landmark
William Jennings Bryan House (Asheville, North Carolina), NRHP-listed

See also
 William Jennings Bryan
 Bryan House (disambiguation)